The following is a list of notable Japanese rock bands and artists. For an extended list of J-Pop artists, see List of J-pop artists.

0-9

The 5.6.7.8's
9mm Parabellum Bullet
10-FEET

12012

A

Abingdon Boys School
Acid Android
Acid Black Cherry
Aldious
Alexandros
Amazarashi
A9
An Cafe
Androp
Animetal
Anthem
Aqua Timez
Asian Kung-Fu Generation
Ayabie

B

B'z
Baad
Babymetal
Back-On
The Back Horn
Back Number
Band-Maid
Base Ball Bear
The Bawdies
Beat Crusaders 
The Blue Hearts
Boom Boom Satellites
Boøwy
Boris
Bow Wow
Brats
Brian the Sun
The Brilliant Green 
Buck-Tick
Bump of Chicken
Burnout Syndromes

C

Cali Gari
Chatmonchy
Church of Misery
Cinema Staff
Coldrain
Crystal Lake
The Collectors
Cö Shu Nie
Crossfaith
Cyntia
Czecho No Republic

D

Dimlim
D
D'espairsRay
Diaura 
Dir En Grey 
DISH//
Do As Infinity
Does
Doll$Boxx
Dragon Ash

E

Earthshaker
Elephant Kashimashi
Ellegarden
Exist Trace
Ezo

F

Fate Gear
Flow
Flower Flower
Flower Travellin' Band
Flumpool
Frederic
Fear, and Loathing in Las Vegas
For Tracy Hyde

G

Gacharic Spin
Gackt
Galileo Galilei
Galneryus
Garnidelia
The Gazette
Gesu no Kiwami Otome 
Girugamesh
Glay
Globe
Going Under Ground
Golden Bomber
The Golden Cups
Granrodeo
Guitar Wolf

H

Happy End
Hello Sleepwalkers 
Hi-Standard
The Hiatus
High and Mighty Color
The High-Lows 
HY

I

I Don't Like Mondays.
Ikimono-gakari
Indigo la End

J

JAM Project
Janne Da Arc 
Jealkb 
Judy and Mary
Jupiter

K 

kizu
Kuroyume
Kagerou
Kagrra,
Kana-Boon 
Keytalk
King Gnu
Kyuso Nekokami

L

L'Arc-en-Ciel 
Lazy
Ling tosite Sigure
LM.C
Loudness
Lovebites
Lovendor
Lucious
Luna Sea

M

Malice Mizer
Man with a Mission
Mary's Blood
Matenrou Opera
Maximum the Hormone
Mejibray
Mongol800
Monkey Majik
Monoral 
The Mops
Mr. Children
Mrs. Green Apple
Mucc 
My First Story
Morfonica

N

NaNa 
Nemophila
Nico Touches the Walls 
Nightmare
Ningen Isu
No Regret Life
Nothing's Carved in Stone 
Novelbright

O

Oblivion Dust
Off Course 
Official Hige Dandism
Okamoto's
Oldcodex
One Ok Rock
The Oral Cigarettes
Orange Range
Outrage (band)

P

P'unk-en-Ciel 
Passepied
The Pees
The Peggies
The Pillows
Plastic Tree
Polkadot Stingray
Polysics
Poppin'Party
Porno Graffitti
Princess Princess

Q

Queen Bee
Quruli

R

Radwimps
Roselia
Raise A Suilen

S

Sabbat
Sakanaction
Sambomaster
Scandal
Sekai no Owari
Sex Machineguns
Shonen Knife
Show-Ya
Sid
Sigh
Silent Siren
SiM
The Sixth Lie
Skin
Southern All Stars
The Spiders
Spitz
Spyair
Stereopony
Straightener
Super Beaver
Suchmos
Sug
Sumika
Supercar
Superfly

T

The Tempters
The Tigers
Tokio
Tokyo Jihen 
Triceraptors
Tube (band)

U

UnsraW
Unicorn 
Uroboros
Uverworld

V

Vamps

W

Wagakki Band
Wands
Wanima

X

X Japan

Y

The Yellow Monkey
Yeti

Z

Zone
Zutomayo

See also 
List of visual kei musical groups
List of musical artists from Japan

References

 
Rock